Nicholls Lake is a lake in Thunder Bay District, Ontario, Canada.

References

Lakes of Thunder Bay District